This is a list of people from Bootle, in Merseyside, England.

Musicians
Noko
Billy J. Kramer
Keith Mullin, guitarist with The Farm
Charles H. Workman

Politicians
Joe Benton
James Burnie
Hardman Lever
Terry Fields
Max Muspratt
Alan Simpson (British politician)
Paul Nuttall

Sportspeople
Jamie Carragher
Peter Cavanagh
Ian Cockbain (cricketer, born 1958)
Nick Dougherty
John Durnin
Phil Edwards (footballer)
Roy Evans
Mick Halsall
Stan Hanson
Bert Harris (footballer)
Jack Kilpatrick
John Miles (footballer)
Jack Parkinson (footballer born 1883)
Alex Smith (ice hockey)
Ernest Latimer Stones
Alvin Martin
Hughie McAuley
James McEwen
Dave Mulligan
Jimmy Payne
Andy Rankin
Arthur Scott (1883–1968), cricketer and Royal Navy officer
Ged Stenson
Ray White (footballer)
Stephen Wright (English footballer)

Other
Derek Acorah, medium and television presenter
George Chapman (healer)
Keith Chegwin, television presenter
 George Davies, fashion retailer, educated in Bootle
Maureen Lee, writer
James Mercer (mathematician)
Tom O'Connor (comedian)
Mary Parke, marine botanist and phycologist
Arthur Herbert Procter, recipient of the Victoria Cross
Matt Simpson, writer and literary critic
Barrie Wells, businessman*
Janice Long, radio presenter

References

Bootle